Findley Lake is located south of Findley Lake, New York. Fish species present in the lake are largemouth bass, northern pike, smallmouth bass, pumpkinseed sunfish, bluegill, walleye, yellow perch, and black bullhead. There is a state owned carry down launch located in Findley Lake off NY-426.

References 

Lakes of Chautauqua County, New York
Lakes of New York (state)